The Rosneath Peninsula is a peninsula in Argyll and Bute, western Scotland. Formerly in the historic county of Dunbartonshire, it is formed on its eastern shore from the confluence of the Firth of Clyde with the Gare Loch, and of the Clyde with Loch Long to the west.

Geography
The 56th parallel north cuts through the southern end of the peninsula.

Naming
The peninsula is named after the parish of Rosneath, where the kirk became the centre of a small village of on its eastern shore, and the barony was controlled from Rosneath Castle, for a time the residence of Princess Louise, Queen Victoria's daughter. As with many grand houses in the area, it has since been demolished.

Settlements
During the Victorian era, from 1850 on, the large contiguous villages of Cove and Kilcreggan were developed, with luxurious summer villas in attractive coastal settings for wealthy Glasgow businessmen whose families could enjoy the fresh air. Piers built at Cove and Kilcreggan had Clyde steamer services taking business commuters to railway terminals such as Greenock, or more leisurely steamer trips down the Firth of Clyde and into Glasgow.

Further north on the western shore of the peninsula, the settlement of Coulport is home to a Royal Navy Armaments Depot, whilst on the eastern shore the hamlet of Rahane overlooks the His Majesty's Naval Base Clyde base of the United Kingdom's nuclear weapons.

Transport
Access to the peninsula is either by road (the B833 which runs from Garelochhead to Coulport) or by ferry from Gourock to Kilcreggan, however the ferry is for foot passengers only. During the summer months PS Waverley calls at Kilcreggan pier. The B833 follows the shoreline but two roads cross the peninsula: both un-numbered, one for local traffic from Ardpeaton to Rahane, the other considerably larger and mainly designed for military traffic between Coulport and Faslane.

More recently the area has become a popular destination for cyclists as it is possible to do a circular tour of the peninsula using the military road.

Settlements

Clynder
Coulport
Cove
Kilcreggan
Rahane
Rosneath

References

External links

 Rosneath Peninsula West Community Development Trust
 Rosneath Peninsula Highland Games
 Rosneath Peninsula Heritage Trail

Peninsulas of Scotland
Landforms of Argyll and Bute
Firth of Clyde